Oriental Orthodoxy in Germany is part of the Oriental Orthodox Christian tradition. Before the beginning of the 20th century, the presence of Oriental Orthodox Christianity in Germany was minor, mainly represented by Armenian communities. It was gradually increasing in the second half of the century with immigration, mainly from the region of Middle East. Today, it is a growing community, well integrated into German society.

Oriental Orthodox jurisdictions in Germany 
Armenian Apostolic Church
Armenian Orthodox Diocese of Cologne
Coptic Orthodox Church 
Coptic Orthodox Diocese of Höxter
Ethiopian Orthodox Tewahedo Church
Ethiopian Orthodox Diocese of Cologne
Syriac Orthodox Church
Syriac Orthodox Metropolis of Germany

See also
 Christianity in Germany
 Coptic Orthodox Church in Europe

References

External links 
 Coptic Orthodox Church in Germany 
 Armenian Catholicos Karekin I in Germany
 Armenian Churches in Europe